John Henry Griffin (August 17, 1913 – November 1984) was an American Negro league pitcher in the 1930s.

A native of Ferguson, Missouri, Griffin played for the St. Louis Stars in 1937. In nine recorded appearances on the mound, he posted a 9.07 ERA over 42.2 innings. Griffin died in St. Louis, Missouri in 1984 at age 71.

References

External links
 and Seamheads

1913 births
1984 deaths
St. Louis Stars (1937) players
20th-century African-American sportspeople